Michèle Pialat (20 June 1942 – 19 September 2021) was a French breaststroke swimmer. She competed in two events at the 1960 Summer Olympics.

References

External links
 

1942 births
2021 deaths
French female breaststroke swimmers
Olympic swimmers of France
Swimmers at the 1960 Summer Olympics
Universiade medalists in swimming
Swimmers from Paris
Universiade silver medalists for France
Medalists at the 1963 Summer Universiade